Idodi is an administrative Division in the Iringa Rural District of the Iringa Region of Tanzania. In 2016 the Tanzania National Bureau of Statistics report there were 10,675 people in the ward, from 10,202 in 2012.

The villages of Mahuninga, Makifu, Tungamalenga, Mapogoro, Kitisi and Malinzanga all fall within Idodi Division.  The Division contains two Wards: Tungamalenga and Mlowa.

Idodi Division is immediately south of Ruaha National Park, Tanzania's largest Park.

Villages / vitongoji 
The ward has 4 villages and 22 vitongoji.

 Idodi
 Ilamba
 Mbuyuni “A”
 Mbuyuni “B”
 Mjimwema “A”
 Mjimwema “B”
 Msimbi
 Mapogoro
 Idindiga
 Kibaoni
 Kisiwani
 Kitanewa
 Lungemba
 Mapogoro
 Kitisi
 Kitisi
 Nyamnango
 Tungamalenga
 Darajani
 Kinyali
 Malunde
 Mbuyuni
 Mlimani
 Msembe
 Ofisini
 Zahanati

References 

Wards of Iringa Region